Jealousy (Italian: Gelosia) is a 1953 Italian drama film directed by Pietro Germi and starring Erno Crisa, Marisa Belli and Vincenzo Musolino. It is based on the 1901 novel Il Marchese di Roccaverdina by Luigi Capuana. It was shot on location around Belmonte Mezzagno in Sicily. The story had previously been made into a 1942 film of the same title.

Plot 
At the church, Rocco, steward on the lands of a landowner, the Marquis of Roccaverdina, marries the beautiful peasant girl Agrippina. But he was shot twice. Justice arrests and condemns a certain Neli. In truth, the assassin is the marquis himself who had contracted a sham marriage with the young woman so that she would remain his mistress...

Cast 
Erno Crisa as  Baron Antonio
Marisa Belli as  Agrippina
Alessandro Fersen as  Don Silvio
Liliana Gerace as  Countess Zosima
Vincenzo Musolino as 	Farmer Rocco
Grazia Spadaro as  Mamma Grazia
Gustavo De Nardo as  Neli Casaccio
 Maresa Gallo as 	Santa
 Pasquale Martino as Commissario
 Renato Pinciroli as 	The Lawyer
 Amedeo Trilli as Il maresciallo
 Guido Medici as 	The Judge
Paola Borboni as  Aunt Baroness 
 Loriana Varoli as 	Cristina
Giovanni Martella as  Salvatore
 Assunta Radico as 	Madre di Agrippina
Gustavo Serena as  Doctor

References

External links

1953 films
Italian drama films
1953 drama films
Films directed by Pietro Germi
Films scored by Carlo Rustichelli
Italian black-and-white films
Films based on Italian novels
Films shot in Sicily
Films set in Sicily
Minerva Film films
Remakes of Italian films
1950s Italian films